The Soreiller hut (Refuge du Soreiller) is a hut in the Massif du Soreiller above the village of Les Étages, in the commune of Saint-Christophe-en-Oisans, France. Nearby mountains include the Aiguille Dibona and the Aiguille du Plat de la Selle.

 Altitude:	2730 m
 Height above road:	1200 m
 Reached in:	2 h 30 approx
 Map:	IGN Top 25 - 3336 Est

External links
 

Mountain huts in France
Buildings and structures in Isère